Robert Martin (7 December 1891 – 24 March 1980) (sometimes credited as Robert G. Martin or Bob Martin) was an American cinematographer.

Filmography

References

External links 
 

1891 births
1980 deaths
American cinematographers